Elena Borisovna Proskurakova (born April 19, 1985 in Karakol) is a Kyrgyzstani judoka, who played for the half-heavyweight category.

Career
She is a five-time national judo champion for the 63 and 70 kg class. She also placed fifth at the 2011 Asian Judo Championships in Abu Dhabi, losing out to Japan's Yoshie Ueno in the bronze medal bout.

Proskurakova represented Kyrgyzstan at the 2008 Summer Olympics in Beijing, where she competed for the women's 78 kg class. She lost her first preliminary match to China's Yang Xiuli, who scored an automatic ippon at fifty-two seconds. Because Yang advanced further into the final match against Cuba's Yalennis Castillo, Proskurakova offered another shot for the bronze medal through the repechage bouts, where she was defeated by Mongolia's Pürevjargalyn Lkhamdegd, who scored a waza-ari awasete ippon (half full point) in the first round.

References

External links
 
 NBC 2008 Olympics profile

1985 births
Living people
People from Issyk-Kul Region
Kyrgyzstani people of Russian descent
Kyrgyzstani female judoka
Olympic judoka of Kyrgyzstan
Judoka at the 2008 Summer Olympics
Judoka at the 2006 Asian Games
Judoka at the 2010 Asian Games
Asian Games competitors for Kyrgyzstan